Panops is a genus of small-headed flies. It is endemic to Australia and the Papua region of Indonesia. Males and females measure 8.0–12.5 mm and 9.5–14.5 mm, respectively.

Species
 Panops aurum Winterton, 2012
 Panops austrae Neboiss, 1971
 Panops baudini Lamarck, 1804
 Panops boharti (Schlinger, 1959)
 Panops conspicuus (Brunetti, 1926)
 Panops danielsi Winterton, 2012
 Panops grossi (Neboiss, 1971)
 Panops jade Winterton, 2012
 Panops schlingeri Winterton, 2012

References

Acroceridae
Nemestrinoidea genera